Kmetija ("The Farm") is a Slovene reality show based on the Swedish franchise The Farm by Strix. Four series have been completed in Slovenia, and there are no plans for more.

Format
Twelve contestants, six female and six male, live on a farm similar to those from a century ago. There is no running water, bathroom, or internet during the ten-week filming of the show. One contestant is eliminated each week until only one remains; this contestant wins a 50,000 EUR cash grand prize. Every week one contestant is Farm Leader. He chose two servants, one male and one female. Between these two servants, the other contestants chose a first duelist. The first duelist chooses a second dualist and the second dualist chooses a type of duel. There are three possible types of duel: tug of wars, saw or knowledge. If housemates are of different genders, the only duel possible is knowledge. The loser of the duel is eliminated, and he or she writes a letter announcing next week's HOH.

Cast
The first two series were presented by Špela Močnik, the celebrity series was presented by Anja Križnik Tomažin and the fourth season will be presented by Lilly Žagar.
 Špela Močnik was presenter of the first two seasons of Kmetija. Before she presented Kmetija, she was a radio presenter on the most listened radio station in Slovenia, Radio Hit. She presented Hitova Budilka (Hit's Wakeup Call), the morning show from 6 to 10 A.M.
 Anja Križnik Tomažin was presenter of Kmetija Slavnih. From 2002 to 2007, she presented "Tistega Lepega Popoldneva" (Eng.: What A Beautilful Afternoon) along with Lado Bizovičar. After TLP she took maternity leave until Kmetija Slavnih.
 The fourth season of Kmetija will be presented by Lili Žagar. She previously presented Svet na Kanalu A (eng.: World on Channel A) daily news.
 In every season is a Farm Master who gives contestants tasks to complete.
 Marijan Podobnik was Farm Master in the first two seasons, as well as in Week 1 and half of Week 2 of the celebrity edition. He died in Week 2 of Kmetija Slavnih.
 Vencelj Tušar replaced Marijan Podobnik in week 3 of Kmetija Slavnih. There was no formal announcement whether he will return for the fourth season of Kmetija after 2 years absence.

Seasons details

Broadcasting
POP TV has broadcast all seasons of Kmetija. There are five or six episodes in one week, depending on the season.

Grand Prize
In the live finale, a winner is chosen. The winner must win at least two duels out of three. The winner in Kmetija 1 and Kmetija 2 won 50,000 € in cash. They were Daša Hliš (Kmetija 1) and Cirila Jeržin (Kmetija 2). In Kmetija Slavnih, a sequins system was introduced. Each week contestants could earn 50 sequins, but they could also spend it. Each sequin is worth 100 €. Goran Breščanski from Kmetija Slavnih won 36,300 €. In the fourth season of Kmetija, the winner won a farm on which the contestants lived for the show along with 12 ha of land.

Viewers elect the People's Winner. In season 1 Klemen and in season 2 Goran Leban won a car, and in Kmetija Slavnih Goran Leban won a car.

Ratings
Soon after the launch of the first season of Kmetija, it became the number one reality show. Kmetija's best rating share was 59%, while Big Brother's best rating share was 43%.

Controversy
In 2007, a criminal complaint was filed against POP TV over the inclusion  of the slaughter of a pig in a Kmetija broadcast.

The 2009 series (Kmetija slavnih, "Celebrity Farm") caused POP TV to be cited by Slovenia's telecommunications regulatory agency (APEK) for failing to protect children and young people against explicit scenes of sex and violence.  The producers were ordered to issue a parental guidance notice.

References
http://kmetija.24ur.com/

2007 Slovenian television series debuts
2000s Slovenian television series 
2010s Slovenian television series 
2011 Slovenian television series endings
Slovenian reality television series
The Farm (franchise)
Pop (Slovenian TV channel) original programming
Television shows set on farms